The Sino Chart was a sales chart in China established in 2009. Chart rankings were based on physical record sales (album, EPs and singles), and did not include download sales.

Charts were published every Sunday for paid members and, on Mondays, were released on their official website.

On April 26, 2015, the site officially closed.

List of number one albums

2013

2014

References

2009 establishments in China
2015 disestablishments in China
Chinese record charts